Ram Kumar Kashyap is an Indian politician serving as a Member of Legislative Assembly in the Haryana Legislative Assembly. He represents Indri Constituency and is a member of the Bharatiya Janata Party. He was formerly a Member of Parliament in the Rajya Sabha.

References

External links

1951 births
People from Kurukshetra
Living people
Rajya Sabha members from Haryana
Indian National Lok Dal politicians
Bharatiya Janata Party politicians from Haryana
Haryana MLAs 2019–2024
People from Ambala district